Bartha Maria Knoppers, OC OQ (born May 26, 1951) is a Canadian law Professor and an expert on the ethical aspects of genetics, genomics and biotechnology.

Born in Hilversum, Netherlands, she received a Bachelor of Arts (French and English Literature) from McMaster University (1972), a Master of Arts degree in comparative literature from the University of Alberta (1974), Bachelor of Common Law (1978) and Civil Law (1981) degrees from McGill University, where she was selected as an Executive Editor for the McGill Law Journal, a Diploma of Legal Studies from University of Cambridge (1981), and a Doctorate of Laws from the University of Paris 1 Pantheon-Sorbonne (1985).  In addition, she became a member of the Quebec Bar (1985).

She was a professor at the Faculty of Law, Université de Montréal (1985-2009). Currently, she is Full Professor at the Department of Human Genetics, Faculty of Medicine, McGill University (2009-), and is an Associate Member of the Faculty of Law (2011) and the Biomedical Ethics Unit (2013). She is also the Director of the Centre of Genomics and Policy, McGill University (2009-), and the Founder and Chair of Public Population Project in Genomics (P3G) Consortium and CARTaGENE, Quebec (2003-2019).

Prof. Knoppers has held the Canada Research Chair in Law and Medicine since 2001. This involves analyzing and developing of national and international policies, laws and guidelines in the field of genomics. She is Co-Founder of the Global Alliance for Genomics and Health (GA4GH) (2013-) and Co-Chair of the Governance Ethics Working Group for the Human Cell Atlas (HCA) (2018-). Previously, Prof. Knoppers was the Chair of the Ethics and Policy Committee of the International Cancer Genome Consortium (ICGC) (2009-2017), the Chair of the International Ethics Committee of the Human Genome Project (2012-2016), and the Chair of the Ethics Working Group of the World Anti-Doping Agency (WADA) (2016-2021). She was also a member of the Drafting Group for the Recommendation of the OECD Council on Health and Data Governance (2015-2016).

Prof. Knoppers has published over 539 peer-reviewed articles, over 114 book chapters and 38 books. She is the lead author of the Stem Cell Charter (2010) and co-edited the Routledge Handbook of Medical Law and Ethics (2014). Her work has been featured in various peer-reviewed academic journals, such as SCIENCE, Nature, BMJ Open, Frontiers in Genetics, to name a few.

Honours 
In 2002, Prof. Knoppers was made an Officer of the Order of Canada in recognition for being "a world authority on the ethical aspects of genetics, genomics and biotechnology". She was also made an Officer of the National Order of Quebec (2012), and a Commander of the Order of Montréal (2016). She holds four Doctorate Honoris Causa: Doctor of Laws from the University of Waterloo (2001); Doctor of Medicine from the University of Paris V – René Descartes (2002); Doctor of Laws from McMaster University (2007); and Doctor of Laws from the University of Alberta (2008). 

She was elected as a Fellow of the American Association for the Advancement of Science (2002), and is a Fellow of the Hastings Center (2000-2002), an independent bioethics research institution. In addition, Prof. Knoppers is a member of the AAAS' Committee on Scientific Freedom and Responsibility since 2020, and is a Fellow of the Canadian Academy of Health Sciences (CAHS) (2017), the Royal Society of Canada’s Academy of Social Sciences (2017), and the Galton Institute (2017). She is a Senior Fellow for the PHG Foundation, University of Cambridge, UK (2019), and gave the Baron de Lancey Lecture in 2022. 

Prof. Knoppers has received numerous awards for her academic achievements. Her most recent recognitions include the Henry G. Friesen International Prize in Health Research (2019), the Till and McCulloch Award for international policy (2020), and the Canadian Bioethics Society Lifetime Achievement award (2021) in recognition of her significant contributions to healthcare ethics through her scholarship and leadership.

References

1951 births
Living people
Alumni of the University of Cambridge
Canada Research Chairs
Canadian legal scholars
Fellows of the American Association for the Advancement of Science
Hastings Center Fellows
McMaster University alumni
Academic staff of McGill University
Officers of the Order of Canada
Officers of the National Order of Quebec
People from Hilversum
University of Alberta alumni
University of Paris alumni
McGill University Faculty of Law alumni
World Anti-Doping Agency members